The War Between the Provinces is a series of fantasy novels by Harry Turtledove.

The novels are a retelling of the American Civil War in a high fantasy setting called the Kingdom of Detina. The series focuses on the Eastern theater of the War Between the Provinces.

The names of locations have been changed, and North and South (and west and east) have been reversed, and, rather than skin color, hair color is used as the basis for the dehumanization. Many of the characters are based on real-world characters, and their names indicate this. Often their names are anagrams of the real-world character they are based on, or their nicknames contain their original's name.
Hand-cranked crossbows replace guns to mirror slow reloading times, and the northern rebels have fewer flying carpet paths (railroads) than the southern kingdom, hence giving the slave-owning side the same logistical problems that existed in the American Civil War.

Some characters with historical counterparts

Southern Detinan characters
 King Avram – counterpart of US President Abraham Lincoln
 General (later Marshal) Bart – counterpart of General Ulysses S. Grant
 General Hesmucet – counterpart of General William Tecumseh Sherman
 General "Doubting" George – counterpart of General George Henry Thomas
 General Guildenstern – counterpart of General William Rosecrans
 General Fighting Joseph – counterpart of General Joseph "Fighting Joe" Hooker
 General John the Hierophant – counterpart of General John Pope
 General Whiskery Ambrose – counterpart of General Ambrose Burnside
 General James the Bird's Eye – counterpart of James Birdseye McPherson
 Mage Alva – counterpart of Thomas Edison

Northern Detinan characters
 King Geoffrey – counterpart of Confederate President Jefferson Davis
 Duke Edward of Arlington – counterpart of General Robert E. Lee
 Thomas the Brick Wall – counterpart of General Thomas "Stonewall" Jackson
 Count Thraxton (the Braggart) – counterpart of General Braxton Bragg
 Marquis Peegeetee of Goodlook – counterpart of General Pierre Beauregard
 Ned of the Forest – counterpart of Nathan Bedford Forest
 Joseph the Gamecock – counterpart of Joseph E. Johnston
 Lt. Gen Bell – counterpart of John Bell Hood
 James of Broadpath – counterpart of James Longstreet
 Richard the Haberdasher – counterpart of Richard Taylor
 Roast Beef William – counterpart of William Hardee
 Provincial Prerogative – counterpart of States Rights Gist
 John of Barsoom – counterpart of General John C. Carter
 Leonidas the Priest – counterpart of Confederate general and Episcopalian bishop Leonidas Polk
 Dan of Rabbit Hill – counterpart of Confederate general D.H. Hill
 Early the Jubilant - counterpart of Jubal Anderson Early

Mentioned Detinan characters
 King Buchan – The previous King of Detina before his death. He was the father of Avram and uncle of Geoffrey. He is based on US President James Buchanan.
 Daniel the Weaver – A Detinan statesman. Ten years before the Detinan Civil War, he worked with Henry Feet of Clay and John the Typhoon to reach a compromise that headed off a war over serfdom by satisfying both northern nobles and King Zachary the Rough and Ready. He is based on Daniel Webster.
 Henry Feet of Clay – A Detinan statesman who is based on Henry Clay.
 John the Typhoon – A Detinan statesman who is based on John C. Calhoun.
 Zachary the Rough and Ready – The King of Detina ten years before the Detinan Civil War. He is based on US President Zachary Taylor.
 Hesmucet – He was a blond king who led a war against the ethnic Detinans before they had become firmly established as the rulers of the continent. Hesmucet frustrated the expansionist intentions of the Detinans for a long time but was killed in battle. He is based on Shawnee chief Tecumseh, who fought the United States during the War of 1812.
 "Inward" – He was the alias of a mage from the Mother Kingdom who anonymously wrote a theory that the gods created lower creatures than humans and other modern animals and let them vie for supremacy of the physical universe without intervening on behalf of early man or anyone else. The notion was condemned as heretical by most mages, and many threats were made against "Inward", which is why he went to great lengths to keep his identity a secret. He is based on British naturalist Charles Darwin.
 Kermit – He was an emperor on the continent across the Western Ocean from Detina. 50 years before the Detinan Civil War, Kermit waged a war against the other western kingdoms to expand his empire. His efforts were met with tremendous initial success, and he established a reputation as one of the world's all-time great military geniuses. However, he attempted to invade the massive southern kingdom of Sorb during the brutal winter months. Although Kermit's forces were able to make it to the Sorbian capital of Pahzbull, his army was forced to retreat from the city and it would never recover from the massive number of casualties that it sustained from the retreat. More men were lost to starvation and the winter temperatures than to Sorbian and allied counteroffensives. Kermit is based on French Emperor Napoleon Bonaparte.

Detinan gods
 Death Lord – The Detinan god of death
 Lion God – One of the two greatest in the Detinan pantheon
 Red Lady – The goddess of the Native Detinan blonds
 Thunderer – One of the two greatest in the Detinan pantheon
 Sweet One – The Detinan goddess of love and sexuality.
 Hunt Lady - The Detinan goddess of the hunt.

Nations and regions
 Southern Detina – based on the United States (Union)
 Northern Detina – based on the Confederate States
 The Mother Kingdom – based on the United Kingdom
 The Sapphire Isle – based on Ireland, occupied by the Mother Kingdom
 An unnamed empire based on France, which fought an analog of the Napoleonic Wars some 50 years before the story setting.
 Sorb – based on Russia

Detinan Provinces
 Baha Province/Golden Province - based on the US state of California
 Cloviston Province - based on the US state of Kentucky
 Croatoan Province - based on the US state of North Carolina
 Dothan Province - based on the US state of Alabama
 East Parthenia - based on the US state of West Virginia
 Franklin Province - based on the US state of Tennessee
 Great River Province - based on the US state of Mississippi
 Highlow Province - based on the US state of Ohio
 New Eborac Province - based on the US state of New York
 Palmetto Province - based on the US state of South Carolina
 Parthenia Province - based on the US state of Virginia
 Peachtree Province - based on the US state of Georgia
 Peterpaulandia Province - based on the US state of Maryland
 ShowMe Province - based on the US state of Missouri

Detinan Cities
 Annasville - based on West Point, New York and Annapolis, Maryland 
 Camphorville, Great River - based on Vicksburg, Mississippi
 Essoville - based on Gettysburg, Pennsylvania
 Georgetown, Detina - capital city of Detina, based on Washington, D.C.
 Hayek, Dothan - based on Selma, Alabama
 Karlsburg, Palmetto - based on Charleston, South Carolina
 Lemon's Justiciary, Parthenia  - based on Orange, Virginia
 Luxor, Franklin - based on Memphis, Tennessee
 Marthasville, Peachtree - based on Atlanta, Georgia
 New Eborac City - largest city in the Province of New Eborac and Detina, based on New York City
 Nonesuch, Parthenia - based on Richmond, Virginia
 Old Capet - based on New Orleans, Louisiana
 Pierreville, Parthenia - based on Petersburg, Virginia
 Ramblerton, Franklin - based on Nashville, Tennessee
 Viziersville, Parthenia - based on Chancellorsville, Virginia
 Warsaw, Franklin
 Whiteside, Franklin

Novels
 Sentry Peak (2000)
 Marching Through Peachtree (2001)
 Advance and Retreat (2002)

References

Novels set during the American Civil War
Novels by Harry Turtledove
 
American fantasy novel series